Barathrodemus is a genus of cusk-eels found in deep waters.

Species
There are currently two recognized species in this genus:
 Barathrodemus manatinus Goode & T. H. Bean, 1883
 Barathrodemus nasutus H. M. Smith & Radcliffe, 1913

References

Ophidiidae